The 2007 SEC women's basketball tournament took place March 1–4, 2007 in Duluth, Georgia at the Arena at Gwinnett Center.

Vanderbilt won the tournament and received the SEC's automatic bid to the NCAA tournament by beating LSU on March 4, 2007 by the score of 51 to 45.

Seeds

Tournament

Asterisk denotes game ended in overtime.

All-Tournament team 
Sylvia Fowles, LSU
RaShonta LeBlanc, LSU
Erica White, LSU
Alexis Hornbuckle, Tennessee
Christina Wirth, Vanderbilt
Carla Thomas, Vanderbilt (MVP)

References

SEC women's basketball tournament
2007 in sports in Georgia (U.S. state)